This is a list of years in South Sudan. See also the timeline of South Sudanese history.  For only articles about years in South Sudan that have been written, see :Category:Years in South Sudan.

Twenty-first century

See also 
 List of years by country

 
South Sudan-related lists
History of South Sudan
South Sudan